Dominic Smith may refer to:

Dominic Smith (baseball) (born 1995), American baseball player
Dominic Smith (gymnast) (born 1993), British acrobatic gymnast
Dominic Smith (footballer, born 1995), English footballer
Dominic Smith (footballer, born 1996), English footballer
Dynamite MC (born Dominic Smith, born 1973), English MC
Dominic Smith (author) (born 1971), Australian-American novelist